Radox is a brand of personal care products, best known for their range of bubble bath and shower gels. The brand was founded in the United Kingdom in 1908, and is now also available in Ireland, Czech Republic, Australia, Malaysia and South Africa. In September 2009 it was bought by Anglo-Dutch multinational Unilever from the Sara Lee Corporation.

Products
The first product produced by Radox was a salts foot bath in 1908, which used the tagline that it "radiates oxygen". Nowadays, it produces many different products such as liquid soap, deodorant, shower gels, and a wide range of bubble baths, bath salts and muscle soaks.

References

External links
 

Bathing
Sara Lee Corporation brands
Unilever brands
Products introduced in 1908